Rhoose Cardiff International Airport railway station is a railway station that serves Cardiff Airport and the village of Rhoose in southeast Wales. A dedicated shuttle bus connects this station with the airport terminal building.

The station opened on 12 June 2005. Passenger services are operated by Transport for Wales as part of the Valley Lines network, an urban rail network serving Cardiff and the surrounding area.

A long title
Following its recent reopening with a new name (the station was known as "Rhoose" before it closed in 1964), this station now holds the distinction of having the longest name for a station as recognised by National Rail in the UK, in both English (33 letters, excluding spaces) and Welsh (Maes Awyr Rhyngwladol Caerdydd Y Rhws – 28 letters, as dd, ng and rh are single letters in Welsh).

Llanfairpwllgwyngyllgogerychwyrndrobwllllantysiliogogogoch railway station arguably has a longer name, but the village in question was deliberately given a contrived name for that very reason, and the station is known officially as either Llanfairpwll or Llanfairpwllgwyngyll – the longer name is not shown on National Rail information documents. Historically, there was a second "longer" station name, as before 2007 Golf Halt on the privately-owned Fairbourne Railway (a heritage railway tourist attraction) was known as "Gorsafawddachaidraigddanheddogleddollônpenrhynareurdraethceredigion", a grammatically-incorrect pseudo-Welsh name that was coined for the express purpose of rivaling Llanfairpwllgwyngyll.

Services
On Sundays there is a two-hourly service in each direction, with eastbound trains terminating at Cardiff Central.

References

External links

 
Rail Link returns after 40 years - BBC News 10 June 2005

Railway stations in the Vale of Glamorgan
Former Barry Railway stations
Railway stations in Great Britain opened in 1897
Railway stations in Great Britain closed in 1964
Reopened railway stations in Great Britain
Railway stations in Great Britain opened in 2005
Railway stations served by Transport for Wales Rail
Airport railway stations in the United Kingdom
Beeching closures in Wales
Rhoose
Railway stations opened by Network Rail